Vavuniya  (romanized: Vavuṉiyā, romanized: Vavuniyāva). Vavuniya City is the capital of Vavuniya District in the Northern Province of Sri Lanka. The municipality is administered by Vavuniya Urban Council. The town has been known since ancient times, but being a heavily forested area, less than 100,000 people lived in the entire district before the Sri Lankan Civil War. The city is situated as a border town that divides the Tamil and Sinhalese population. To the south of the city are the Sinhala cities and to the north are the Tamil cities. The city has a large population of Tamils, Muslims and a significant number of Sinhalese. In the early days, Vavuniya was known as Vanni due to the abundance of Vanni Trees. The Security Forces Headquarters - Wanni is located in Vavuniya.

History 
This city was under the rule of the Tamil Kings over thousand years period of the Yaka and Nagas in ancient Sri Lanka. Many Tanks were constructed by the Tamil kings who ruled this area in this area and Naga Sacred Guard Stones were placed near them and inscriptions were engraved. 

Later, following the arrival of the Sinhalese to Sri Lanka, the region came under the Rajarata kingdom. Later, after the Chola invasion, Saivism and Tamil revived in the city. After the Cholas were defeated by the Pandyas in Tamil Nadu, Vavuniya was taken over by the Pandyas during their invasion of Sri Lanka. As the Pandyas were dispersed during the vijaya nagara invasion and their strength diminished in Sri Lanka, the Vanni who arrived with the Cholas broke free from the Pandyas in Sri Lanka and formed the submissive Vanni nation. The Vanni Rasadani, which had remained unyielding during the Portuguese period, came under the control of the Dutch in the maneuver of the hero Pandaravannian in the Dutch invasion. Then the Dutch handed Sri Lanka over to the British and it came under British rule.

After the British granted independence to Sri Lanka, many people migrated abroad and to Vavuniya as the war caused by the Sinhalese oppression forced the affluent population to migrate.Vavuniya is a city that has recovered from the war even though it was heavily affected by the war. Now here Tamils, Muslims and Sinhalese are united without distinction.Recently the district got its own university. Discussions are going on to make this Urban Council a Municipal Council now. And there are discussions to convert the district airport into an international airport.

Demographics 
The total population of the Northern Province as per the statistics is 1.246 million, the lowest populous province in the country, with 606,678 males (47.3%) and 639,775 females (52.7%). The population density is 136 persons per Sq. Km as against to 346 for the whole Island. The majority in the province live in areas classified as rural (84.5%), and only 15.5% of the population live in areas classified as urban. The majority of the population i.e. 89% in the province are Sri Lankan Tamils and others are Sri Lankan Moors, Sinhalese and Indian Tamils living in the province. Most of the Sri Lankan Tamils are Hindus, and the other religious persuasions in the province are Christians, Muslims, and a small number of Buddhists. The graph here shows the difference in ethnic composition from province to district to city. While usually, the city shows a more cosmopolitan nature than the province. The Vavuniya city reflects the composition of the district quite closely, even more so than the provincial percentages.

Electoral Wards

Transport
Vavuniya railway station, which is located on the Northern Line connects Kankesanthurai (the northern terminus of the line) through to Colombo. During the civil war Vavuniya was the terminus of the Northern Line.Vavuniya airport, which is an air force base and a domestic airport is also located here.Vavuniya is situated in the middle of the Vanni region and is the gate to northern province where people can access all the northern cities quickly.

See also
Vipulanantha College
Pandarikulam
Nelukkulam

References 

 
Cities in Sri Lanka
Populated places in Vavuniya District
Vavuniya DS Division